Maria Plyta (27 November 1915 – 4 March 2006) was a Greek screenwriter and film director.

Selected filmography
 The She-Wolf (1951)
 Eva (1953)
 The Duchess of Plakendia (1956)

References

Bibliography 
 Vrasidas Karalis. A History of Greek Cinema. A&C Black, 2012.

External links 
 

1915 births
2006 deaths
Mass media people from Thessaloniki
Greek screenwriters
Greek film directors
20th-century screenwriters